Should We Be Silent? (German: Dürfen wir schweigen?) is a 1926 German silent drama film directed by Richard Oswald and starring Conrad Veidt, Walter Rilla and Henri De Vries. It was made at the Johannisthal Studios in Berlin. The film exists only in fragmentary form.

Cast
 Conrad Veidt as Paul Hartwig, painter
 Walter Rilla as Dr. Georg Mauthner
 Henri De Vries as Henry Pierson, town councillor
 Mary Parker as Leonie Pierson, his daughter
 Elga Brink as assistant
 Frida Richard as old woman
 Fritz Kortner as announcing doctor
 John Gottowt as his factotum
 Maria Forescu as 1st patient
 Else Plessner as 2nd patient
 Betty Astor as Inge
 Ernő Verebes as Gerd
 Albert Paulig as waiter

References

Bibliography
 Soister, John T. & Battle, Pat Wilks. Conrad Veidt on Screen: A Comprehensive Illustrated Filmography. McFarland, 2002.

External links
 

1926 drama films
1926 films
Films directed by Richard Oswald
Films shot in Berlin
German drama films
Films of the Weimar Republic
German silent feature films
Lost German films
German black-and-white films
Bavaria Film films
Films shot at Johannisthal Studios
1926 lost films
Lost drama films
Silent drama films
1920s German films
1920s German-language films